Wheelock Church (also known as Wheelock Mission Church) is a historic church building in Millerton, McCurtain County, Oklahoma. Built in 1845-6, the existing stone structure is the oldest surviving church building in the state of Oklahoma and the oldest church congregation among the Choctaw nation. The building was added to the National Register of Historic Places in 1972.

History
The congregation was established in 1832, and the current stone church building was constructed in 1845–1846 with a cemetery established across the road. Buried in the cemetery is Alfred Wright, a physician and missionary to the Choctaw Native Americans.  Wright translated many books into the Choctaw language, including the New Testament.
Until the church building was completed, the services were held outdoors under a large oak tree. The congregation sat on logs placed in rows under the tree. Rev. Wright used an overturned 100-gallon barrel as his pulpit. He preached his first sermon there on December 9, 1832.

In 1832 Wright also built a small log cabin church and a larger log house to accommodate the family. He added a large room to the latter, where his wife, Harriet Bunce Wright, and teacher Anna Burnham could teach local Choctaw children, using a day school format. This would continue until 1839, and would become the nearby Wheelock Academy, a boarding school, which the Choctaw Council sanctioned as a girls' seminary in 1842.

The stone church
The new building, soon called the "Stone Church," was begun in 1845 and completed in 1846. Financed by donations and constructed by volunteer laborers (mostly Choctaw), it has -thick stone walls and a vaulted ceiling over the main floor and balcony. A slogan favored by Rev. Wright, “Jehovah Jireh” (“the Lord will provide”) was carved into the gable and is said to be still legible. In 1866 the church was damaged by a fire that destroyed the mission to the east, and the church's roof was not restored until 1884.

The Wrights' deaths
Wright was often absent from the pulpit because, as the only person in the area trained in medicine, he would ride out to the home of any one who he heard was ill. However, this practice aggravated his own frail health. He suffered from bursitis, intermittent fevers and an undefined heart problem. He suffered his last attack and died on March 31, 1853. As he had requested earlier, his body was buried in the Wheelock cemetery.

Harriet struggled to keep the mission and school operating, but her own health began failing about a year after Alfred's death. She had to leave Indian Territory and go back east to live with relatives. She died in Madison, Florida on Oct. 3, 1863, and was buried there.

Rev. John Edwards
The American Board of Missionaries sent Rev. John Edwards to replace Rev. Wright as Wheelock's superintendent, and John Libby as Edwards' assistant. In 1861, after the Choctaw Nation formally allied itself with the Confederate States of America, becoming a belligerent state in the American Civil War, the ABM ordered Edwards to leave Indian Territory and return to the North.

Edwards traveled to San Francisco, California in 1861, where he taught for two years. He then moved to Oakland, California and served as supply minister for several churches for the next 20 years. In 1882, he returned to work among the Choctaws, first at Atoka, then at Wheelock, where he reopened the academy in 1884. He served as academy superintendent until 1895, when the Choctaw Nation took it over. In 1896, he returned to San Jose, California, where he remained until his death December 18, 1903.

Final year
Rev. Evan B. Evans came to Wheelock as the supply minister for one year in 1897. By that time, there were only 60 members, principally students at the school who lived some distance from Wheelock. The students were absent from church for much of the year, so services were discontinued at Wheelock at the end of the year.

Notes

See also
Wheelock Academy
Oldest churches in the United States
Oldest buildings in Oklahoma

References

External links
Historical Information

Presbyterian churches in Oklahoma
Churches on the National Register of Historic Places in Oklahoma
Buildings and structures in McCurtain County, Oklahoma
Churches completed in 1846
19th-century Presbyterian church buildings in the United States
National Register of Historic Places in McCurtain County, Oklahoma
Former churches in Oklahoma